The 2009 MLP Nations Cup was the seventh edition of the women's ice hockey tournament. It was held from January 2-6, 2009 in Ravensburg, Germany. Sweden won the tournament by defeating Canada U22 in the final.

Tournament

First round

Group A

Group B

Final round

5th place game

Semifinals

3rd place game

Final

External links
Tournament on hockeyarchives.info

2009–10
2009–10 in women's ice hockey
2009–10 in Swiss ice hockey
2009–10 in German ice hockey
2009–10 in Canadian women's ice hockey
2009–10 in Finnish ice hockey
2009–10 in Russian ice hockey
2009–10 in Swedish ice hockey
2009